KBRJ is a commercial country music radio station in Anchorage, Alaska, broadcasting on 104.1 FM.  Owned by Alpha Media LLC, its studios are located in Anchorage (two blocks west of Dimond Center), and its transmitter is in the Bayshore neighborhood in South Anchorage.

References

External links

1966 establishments in Alaska
Alpha Media radio stations
Country radio stations in the United States
Radio stations established in 1966
BRJ